The Floresta Formation (Df) is a geological formation of the Altiplano Cundiboyacense in the Eastern Ranges of the Colombian Andes. The unit is highly fossiliferous; brachiopods, bryozoans, gastropods, trilobites, corals and bivalves have been found in the Floresta Formation. Some fragments of Placoderm fish fossils were found in the Floresta Formation, while the overlying Cuche Formation is much richer in fish biodiversity.

Etymology 
The formation was first described as Floresta Series by Olsson and Carter in 1939. The current definition was given by Botero in 1950. The formation is named after Floresta, Boyacá, where the formation outcrops.

Description

Lithologies 
The Floresta Formation is characterized by a lower sequence of shales and ochre to beige siltstones with alternating coquinas, while the upper part consists of siltstones with sandy beds.

Stratigraphy and depositional environment 
The Floresta Formation overlies the El Tíbet Formation and is overlain by the Cuche Formation. The age has been estimated to be Late Emsian to Early Givetian. Stratigraphically, the formation is time equivalent with the Portachuelo Formation around Quetame. The Onondaga Formation of New York is considered time equivalent too. The formation contains concretions and a high diversity of fossils. The formation was deposited in a transgressional and regressional epicontinental marine environment at the edge of the Paleo-Tethys Ocean. The uppermost part of the formation has been deposited in a deltaic setting, with the lower sequence formed in a coral reef environment.

Fossil content 
Remains of Barroisella sp., ?Tarutiglossa sp., Dipleura cf. dekayi, Dechenella boteroi, Mannopyge sp., Cordania gasepiou, Viaphacops cristata, Anchiopsis armata, Synphoria stemmata, Coronura cf. lessepsensis, Greenops cf. grabaui, Belenopyge contusa, Kettneraspis callicera, Placoderm fishes, Platyceras nodosum, Acrospirifer olssoni, Anoplotheca cf. silvetii, Atrypa harrisi, Australospirifer cf. antarcticus, Aviculopecten wellsi, Brachyspirifer palmerae, Camarotoechia dotis, Chonetes cf. billingsi, C. comstockii, C. cf. stubeli, Chonostrophia knodi, Cyclotrypa boyaca, C. carribeana, C. dickeyi, C. reticulata, C. stellata, Cymostrophia dickeyi, C. schucherti, C. waringi, Cypricardinia cf. subindenta, Cyrtina hamiltonensis, Dalmanites cf. patacamayaensis, Dictyostrophia cooperi, Elytha colombiana, Eodevonaria imperialis, Favosites aff. hamiltonensis, Fenestrellina colombiana, F. olssoni, F. acuta, F. quadrata, F. harrisi, Fistulipora anomala, F. megalopora, Florestacanthus morenoi, Heliophyllum halli, Intrapora fragilis, I. megalopora, Leiorhynchus mysia, Leptaena boyaca, Meganteris australis, Megastrophia hopkinsi, M. pygmaea, Meristella wheeleri, Nucleospira concinna, Odontopleura callicera, Pentagonia gemmisulcata, Phacops cf. salteri, Pholidops florestae, Platyostoma lineata, Pleurodictyum americanum, Polypora elegantula, P. granulifera, Prismopora inornata, Schellwienella goldringae, Semicoscinium colombiensis, S. minutum, Spinocyrtia cf. valenteana, Spinulicosta spinulicosta, Spirifer kingi, Strophonella floweri, S. meridionalis, Sulcoretepora olssoni, S. subramosa, Taeniopora florestae, Tropidoleptus carinatus, Unitrypa casteri, Acanthograptus sp., Actinopteria sp, Amphigenia sp., Anthozoa sp., Camarotoechia sp., Cryptonella sp., Cyphaspis sp., Cryphaeus sp., Dalmanites sp., Derbyina sp., Gastropoda sp., Grammysia sp., Homalonotus sp., Leptostrophia sp., Mediospirifer sp., Orthoceras sp., Ostracoda sp., Orthis sp., Paraspirifer sp., Proetus sp., Pterinea sp., Strophodonta sp., Thamnopora sp., and Vitulina sp. have been described from the Floresta Formation. Colombianaspis carvalhoae gen. et sp. nov., Schizobolus pilasiensis sp. nov. and Tarijactinoides sp. nov., were newly described in 2015.

Outcrops 

The Floresta Formation is found at the Floresta Massif around its type locality in Floresta, Boyacá, stretching to the south until between Busbanzá and Nobsa and to the west close to Belén, Cerinza and Tutazá. The formation is also found in the upper course of the Chicamocha River in the eponymous canyon.

Many of the fossils are on display in the paleontological museum of Floresta.

Regional correlations

See also 

 Geology of the Eastern Hills
 Geology of the Ocetá Páramo
 Geology of the Altiplano Cundiboyacense

Notes

References

Bibliography

Maps

External links 
  Peces devónicos de Colombia, diversidad en los mares y ríos de hace 410-355 millones de años

 
Geologic formations of Colombia
Devonian System of South America
Devonian Colombia
Shale formations
Deltaic deposits
Reef deposits
Geography of Boyacá Department